Jack Anthony Santora (born 6 October 1976) is an Italian-American former professional baseball infielder who played internationally for the Italy national baseball team, and who is currently a coach in the Los Angeles Angels organization.

Early life
Santora grew up in Monterey, CA.
Father, Vic Santora, coached football and baseball.
Brother, Phil Santora, coached high school baseball and softball at Monterey High School.
Santora attended UCLA. In 1998, he played collegiate summer baseball for the Hyannis Mets of the Cape Cod Baseball League, and was named a league all-star.

Professional baseball career

Arizona Diamondbacks
The Arizona Diamondbacks drafted Santora in the 19th Round of the 1999 Major League Baseball draft. He played for the Missoula Osprey in 1999. In 2000, he played for the South Bend Silver Hawks. In 2001, he played for the El Paso Diablos. He split 2002 between El Paso and the Tucson Sidewinders.

San Diego Padres
Santora played with the Lake Elsinore Storm in 2003.

Philadelphia Phillies
Santora played with the Lakewood BlueClaws in 2003 and the Clearwater Threshers in 2004.

Newark Bears
Santora played with the Newark Bears from 2003–2006.

Italian Baseball League
He played for Telemarket Rimini in the Italian Baseball League from 2007-2013.

Italy national team 
As a member of Italy national baseball team he won two European Baseball Championships, in 2010 and in 2012.

References

External links

1976 births
Living people
American people of Italian descent
Sportspeople from Monterey, California
Baseball coaches from California
Baseball players from California
Baseball infielders 
Italian baseball players
T & A San Marino players
American expatriate baseball players in San Marino
UCLA Bruins baseball players
Hyannis Harbor Hawks players
South Bend Silver Hawks players
El Paso Diablos players
Missoula Osprey players
Tucson Sidewinders players
Lake Elsinore Storm players
Lakewood BlueClaws players
Clearwater Threshers players
Newark Bears players
Rimini Baseball Club players
2013 World Baseball Classic players
2009 World Baseball Classic players
Minor league baseball coaches